The 1999 Whites Drug Store Classic was held from November 11 to 17 at the Swan Lake Curling Club in Swan Lake, Manitoba. In the all-Manitoba final, Kelly Skinner defeated Howie Restall in five ends, 9–3.

Teams

Kevin Park
Rob Van Kommer
Peter Prokopowich
Allan Lyburn
Doug Harrison
Terry Dennis
Brent Braemer
Brian White
John Bubbs
Brent Strachan
Ron Tibble
Robert Staples
Kelly Skinner
Gary Scheirich
Vic Peters
Sid Trofimenkoff
Dale Duguid
Marion Parasiuk
Brian Fowler
Jeff Hartung
Brian Pallister
Pat Spiring
Doug Armour
Orest Meleschuk
Mark Hadway
Barry Fry
Don Spriggs
Murray Woodward
Brian Darling
Howie Restall
Kerry Burtnyk
David Bohn

Draw

A Event

B Event

C Event

Playoffs

Quarterfinals

Semifinals

Final
Sunday, November 14, 6:00pm

External links
Results

1999 in Canadian curling
1999 in Manitoba
Curling in Manitoba